There are two Louis-Valentin Robert :

1) Louis Valentin Robert born 15 September 1819 (Étampes) died 2 October 1819 (Étampes)

His younger brother with the same name :

2) Louis Valentin Robert called Élias Robert born 6 June 1821 (Étampes) died 29 April 1874 (Paris) is a French sculptor. His major works include :

 Phryne, Louvre museum (1855)
 France crowning Art and Industry (1855)
 Justice, a bronze crowning one of the columns of Fontaine Saint-Michel (1861)
 Agriculture and Industry displayed on the main facade of Gare d'Austerlitz (1868)
 the Caryatid of Conservatoire des Arts et Métiers

A collection of his works was donated to the city museum of Étampes after his death.

Footnotes

External links
 

1819 births
1874 deaths
French architectural sculptors
19th-century French sculptors
French male sculptors
19th-century French male artists